James Sherman (25 March 1791 at Crayford, Kent – 21 June 1831 at Mitcham, Surrey) was an English professional cricketer.  He was the younger brother of John Sherman and the father of Tom Sherman.

Career
Sherman, an occasional wicketkeeper, was mainly associated with Surrey and he made 12 known appearances in first-class matches from 1810 to 1821. He made his first-class debut at the England v Surrey XI at Lord's (Old), July 16–18 1810. His last first-class appearance was at the Gentlemen v Players at Lord's, July 23–24, 1821.

References

External sources
 CricketArchive record

1791 births
1831 deaths
English cricketers
English cricketers of 1787 to 1825
Players cricketers
Surrey cricketers
St John's Wood cricketers
Lord Frederick Beauclerk's XI cricketers